Fiore e Tinelli is an Italian television series.

See also
List of Italian television series
Quelli dell'intervallo

External links
 

Italian television series
2007 Italian television series debuts
2009 Italian television series endings